Acute posthemorrhagic anemia or acute blood loss anemia is a condition in which a person quickly loses a large volume of circulating hemoglobin. Acute blood loss is usually associated with an incident of trauma or a severe injury resulting in a large loss of blood. It can also occur during or after a surgical procedure.

See also
 List of circulatory system conditions
 List of hematologic conditions

References

External links 

Anemias